Yehuda Leib Tsirelson (1859 in Kozelets, Chernihiv Oblast – 1941 in Kishinev, Soviet Union) was the Chief Rabbi of Bessarabia, a member of the Romanian parliament, and a prominent Jewish leader and posek.

Biography

Yehuda Leib Tsirelson was the son of the Rabbi of Kozelets, Moishe Chayim. He was considered a prodigy at a young age and became the Rabbi of Priluki at the age of nineteen. During that time he began writing for various periodicals in Hebrew, Yiddish and Russian. His articles dealt mainly with ongoing Jewish issues, mostly of a political nature.

Zionist activism
In 1898 he participated in the first all-Russian Zionist conference in Warsaw. At first he supported the Mizrachi movement and Zionism but later he became disappointed with the movement and left it, turning less moderate in his views.

Rabbinic career
In 1908 he was appointed religious and crown rabbi of Kishinev. In 1911 he was one of the signatories of a letter by 300 prominent Russian Rabbis against the antisemitic Beilis affair case. That same year he received the title of honorable citizen of Russian empire. In 1912 he was among a core group of Jewish leaders and Rabbis who laid the foundation for the Agudat Israel movement. In 1918 Bessarabia became part of Romania and Rabbi Tsirelson was nominated Chief Rabbi of the whole Bessarabia. He developed there a Jewish educational system, beginning from kindergarten and ending with yeshiva. Many prominent rabbis, including future Rabbis of Rîbnița (Rabbi Chaim Zanvl Abramowitz) and Bohush, studied in his yeshiva. After the Soviet Union collapsed, the new Kishinev yeshiva was established in the building of the old one.

Political career
In 1920 having knowledge of the Romanian language he was elected to represent the Jews of Bessarabia in the Parliament of Romania in Bucharest. In 1922 he became the only Bessarabian Jewish representative in the parliament. While the antisemitism in Romania was strongly growing. In parliament Tsirelson tried to warn about the growing antisemitism in Romania, but the delegates refused to publish his speeches in the parliament periodical. As a result, Tsirelson resigned from parliament in 1926. In 1920 he established the Agudat Israel branch in Kishinev, which later became autonomous. He chaired two Agudat Israel councils in 1923 and 1929. In 1923 he strongly supported Meir Shapiro's idea of Daf Yomi. After the Soviet annexation of Bessarabia he was labeled by communist-backed newspapers as an anti-soviet agent. He was executed together with forty other Jewish leaders by the order of the Germans after they captured Kishinev in June of 1941.

Awards and recognition
Most of his works were published after his death in Israel and in the United States. His great-nephew was the Israeli mathematician Boris Tsirelson.

References

External links
www.lechaim.ru
http://www.math.tau.ac.il/~tsirel/faq2.html

1859 births
1941 deaths
Orthodox rabbis from Russia
Members of the Chamber of Deputies (Romania)
People from Kozelets
20th-century Romanian politicians
Romanian Orthodox rabbis
Romanian Jews who died in the Holocaust
Russian Jews who died in the Holocaust